is a Japanese singer and songwriter. He debuted as a major label artist in 2009, with the single "Morning Sun." He is best known for this song, as well as writing Yui Horie's 2011 single "Immoralist."

Biography

Kiyoshi was born in 1989, and grew up in Osaka. At 15 he began to write his own music, and in the summer of 2005 produced demo recordings, which he sent to many music record personnel, beginning his musical career. In 2006, Kiyoshi competed at the Teens Rock high school band music competition and won the grand prize, which led to his appearance at the Rock in Japan Festival summer festival in 2006, as one of his prizes.

In 2008, Kiyoshi released his first song commercially before being signed to a record label, with the song "Send" featured on the film Cyborg She'''s soundtrack. He debuted officially in 2009 under EMI Music Japan with the song "Morning Sun," which was used in a commercial campaign for cellphone provider AU. Kiyoshi released his debut album Philosophy later in the month. The album was awarded a runner up award in the 2010 second CD Shop Awards.

In 2010 Kiyoshi released his second album, World, led by the singles "Help Me Help Me Help Me" and "Itai yo." After the release of the album, Kiyoshi held his first major tour across Japan. In 2011, a song written by Kiyoshi, "Immortalist," was released by voice actress Yui Horie, and was used as the theme song for the animation Dragon Crisis!. The song became a top 10 single on Oricon's singles chart. Two months later, Kiyoshi released his third album, People.

 Discography 

 Albums 

Singles

Other charted songs

 DVDs 

 Music videos 

 Awards 

|-
| rowspan="1" align="center"|2006
| rowspan="1"|Kiyoshi Ryujin
| Teens Rock in Hitachinaka 2006
|
|-
| rowspan="2" align="center"|2009
| rowspan="2"|"Morning Sun"
| FM Festival "Life Music Award 2009" Best Voice of Life
|
|-
| FM Festival "Life Music Award 2009" Best New Artist of Life
|
|-
| rowspan="2" align="center"|2010
| Philosophy''
| The Second CD Shop Awards
|
|-
| "Help Me Help Me Help Me"
| Space Shower Music Video Awards 2010 Best New Artist Video
|

References

External links 
Official site 
EMI label site 
Official blog 
 

1989 births
Japanese-language singers
Japanese male singer-songwriters
Japanese singer-songwriters
Living people
People from Osaka
21st-century Japanese singers
21st-century Japanese male singers